The Courage C65 was a Le Mans Prototype (LMP) race car, designed, developed, and built by French constructor Courage in 2003, and used in international sports car races until 2006.

References

Le Mans Prototypes
24 Hours of Le Mans race cars
Rear-wheel-drive vehicles
Mid-engined cars
Sports prototypes
Cars introduced in 2003
C65
2000s cars
Cars of France